The name Agnes has been used for a total of sixteen tropical cyclones worldwide: one in the Atlantic Ocean, thirteen in the Western North Pacific Ocean, one in the South-West Indian Ocean, and one in the South Pacific Ocean.

In the Atlantic:

 Hurricane Agnes (1972), a Category 1 hurricane that formed over the Yucatán Peninsula and made landfall on the Florida Panhandle
The name Agnes was retired in the Atlantic after the 1972 hurricane season.

In the Western North Pacific:

 Typhoon Agnes (1948) (T4834), a Category 2 Typhoon that struck Japan
 Typhoon Agnes (1952) (T5220), a Category 5 Super Typhoon that was November typhoon and did not approach land closely
 Typhoon Agnes (1957) (T5707), a Category 4 Super Typhoon that passed over the Ryūkyū Islands at peak strength before making landfall in South Korea as a tropical storm
 Tropical Storm Agnes (1960) (T6013, 29W), a tropical storm that passed over Taiwan in August
 Typhoon Agnes (1963) (T6308, 18W, Ising), struck northern Luzon in the Philippines as a Category 2 typhoon before entering the South China Sea where it made a second landfall in China
 Tropical Storm Agnes (1965) (T6527, 33W), a tropical storm which formed in the South China Sea and made landfall in Guangdong, China
 Typhoon Agnes (1968) (T6813, 17W), a Category 5 Super Typhoon that did not approach land
 Typhoon Agnes (1971) (T7127, 29W, Warling), a Category 1 Typhoon that struck Taiwan causing severe flooding in Taipei
 Typhoon Agnes (1974) (T7422, 26W), a Category 3 Typhoon that stayed well clear of land
 Tropical Storm Agnes (1978) (T7809, 09W), a tropical storm in the South China sea that performed a cyclonic loop before hitting China
 Typhoon Agnes (1981) (T8118, 18W, Pining), a Category 2 typhoon that caused severe flooding in South Korea
 Typhoon Agnes (1984) (T8424, 27W, Undang), reached Category 4 strength before passing through the Philippines causing over 500 deaths, then made a second landfall in Vietnam
 Tropical Storm Agnes (1988) (T8807, 07W), a tropical storm in late July that formed near Iwo Jima

In the South-West Indian:

 Tropical Storm Agnes (1971), made landfall in northern Madagascar

In the South Pacific:

 Cyclone Agnes (1995), a Category 3 cyclone south of Port Moresby in the Coral Sea that did not approach land

Atlantic hurricane set index articles
Pacific typhoon set index articles
South-West Indian Ocean cyclone set index articles
Australian region cyclone set index articles